Cwmpennar (or Cwm Pennar) is a small village in Mountain Ash which is situated in the Cynon Valley, Rhondda Cynon Taff, Wales.

Cwmpennar lies opposite a former coal mining pit. Cwmpennar is part of the Cefnpennar District Welfare Association (CDWA). On 2 May 1867 an explosion took place at Cwmpennar Pit.

References

Villages in Rhondda Cynon Taf
Mountain Ash, Rhondda Cynon Taf